Charles-B.-Banville Ecological Reserve is an ecological reserve of Quebec, Canada. It was established on April 1, 1998.

References

External links
 Official website from Government of Québec

Protected areas of Bas-Saint-Laurent
Nature reserves in Quebec
Protected areas established in 1998
1998 establishments in Quebec